Rudolf Neuhaus (3 January 1914 − 7 March 1990) was a German conductor.

Life 
Born in Cologne, Neuhaus studied at the Musikhochschule Köln, especially with Hermann Abendroth. In 1937 he joined the Nazi Party.

In 1945 he came to Schwerin and worked there as a conductor until 1953, and from 1950 he succeeded Hans Gahlenbeck as Generalmusikdirektor of the Mecklenburgische Staatskapelle. He became a member of the Christian Democratic Union (East Germany). He also directed the music section of the Mecklenburg State Association in the Cultural Association of the GDR.

In 1953 he was appointed conductor at the Staatsoper in Dresden and lecturer at the Musikhochschule Dresden. Guest conductors have taken him to the Staatsoper Berlin, the Leipzig Gewandhaus orchestra and the Konzerthausorchester Berlin. He was appointed professor in 1959. His students included  and Udo Zimmermann.

He conducted numerous world premieres and first performances. Neuhaus died in Dresden at thee age of 76.

Awards 
 1964: Kunstpreis der DDR
 1974: Vaterländischer Verdienstorden in Bronze
 1979: Vaterländischer Verdienstorden in Silber
 1984: Vaterländischer Verdienstorden in Gold
 1987: 
 1989: .

Publications 
 .

Literature 
 Grete Grewolls: Wer war wer in Mecklenburg und Vorpommern. Das Personenlexikon. Hinstorff Verlag, Rostock 2011, .
 Harry Waibel: Diener vieler Herren. Ehemalige NS-Funktionäre in der SBZ/DDR.Peter Lang, Frankfurt 2011, .

References

External links 
 
 
 

1914 births
1990 deaths
Musicians from Cologne
German conductors (music)
Recipients of the Patriotic Order of Merit in gold
Nazi Party members
Christian Democratic Union (East Germany) politicians